Billy Hudson (June 16, 1938 – November 30, 2022) was an American politician who served in the Mississippi State Senate from the 45th district from 2008 until 2020.

Education and professional career 
Hudson attended the University of Southern Mississippi; he also attended the University of Arizona and Perkinston Junior College (now Mississippi Gulf Coast Community College) in 1957. His professional experience included working as a rancher, and previously serving as the CEO of Hudson Salvage.

Political career 
Hudson was the Forrest County Supervisor for eight years and then served in the Mississippi State Senate for twelve years.

Personal life and death 
Hudson was married to Barbara Hudson and had five children.

Hudson died on November 30, 2022, at the age of 84.

References 

1938 births
2022 deaths
20th-century American businesspeople
21st-century American politicians
People from Hattiesburg, Mississippi
University of Arizona alumni
University of Southern Mississippi alumni
Mississippi Gulf Coast Community College alumni
Businesspeople from Mississippi
County supervisors in Mississippi
Republican Party Mississippi state senators